Slaking may refer to:
Slaking (geology), the process in which earth materials disintegrate and crumble when exposed to moisture
Slaking, the process, by adding water, of turning the traditional building material lime from calcium oxide (burnt lime or quicklime) into calcium hydroxide (slaked lime, slack lime, limewater, pickling lime or hydrated lime)
Slaking pits are used to add water to lime 
Slaking (Pokémon), a species from the Pokémon video games and anime.
Slaking(Chemistry), is the reaction of alkaline earth metal oxides(except BeO) reacting with water to form sparingly soluble hydroxides.